NRSP may refer to:
 National Revolutionary Socialist Party
 NRSP Micro Finance Bank Limited
 Natural Resources Stewardship Project
 NRSP Micro Finance Bank Limited
New Riders of the Purple Sage